Favonius can refer to:

 Favonius (wind god), one of the Anemoi; the west wind in Roman mythology
 Favonius (butterfly), a genus of butterflies
 Favonius (horse), winner of the 1871 Epsom Derby

See also
 Favonia gens, a family (gens) of Ancient Rome
 Knights of Favonius, an organization from the 2020 game Genshin Impact